Léopold Dion (February 25, 1920 – 17 November 1972) was a Canadian sex offender and serial killer who raped 21 boys, killing four; he was active in Quebec in 1963. He was nicknamed the "Monster of Pont-Rouge".

Crimes
His first sexual assault, which also involved an attempted murder, was against a young woman from Pont-Rouge. Léopold Dion and his brother raped and stabbed the woman on the railway track linking the Rang Petit-Capsa (a street) to the village of Pont-Rouge. They left her for dead, but she survived, albeit with both physical and psychological injuries.

Dion sexually abused 21 boys, killing four. He lured his victims by posing as a photographer.

His first murder victim was 12-year-old Guy Luckenuck, from Kénogami, Quebec, who was in Quebec City that day for clarinet lessons. They traveled together every week to take music lessons at the Conservatoire de Musique du Québec in Québec City. Dion lured the boy by taking a series of snapshots with an old camera that had no film before claiming to want to continue elsewhere. He drove the boy into the country, where, in a remote spot, Dion then strangled him, and then buried him.

On 5 May 1963, Dion crossed paths with eight-year-old Alain Carrier and 10-year-old Michel Morel. He used the same ploy to lure them into his car, driving them to a run-down building in Saint-Raymond-de-Portneuf. With the former, he pretended to play prisoner so that he could tie the boy up in the cottage. Once he had been overcome, Dion turned to the latter one, whom he led outside, whereupon he asked the child to take his clothes off. Dion then strangled him with a garrote, before going back inside to smother the other boy.

On 26 May 1963, he met 13-year-old Pierre Marquis, who was also taken in by the fake photographer’s promises. They were a couple of paces from a dune, the same one that had become Guy Luckenuck’s grave a bit more than a month earlier. Once again, Dion asked his victim to pose naked. The child complied, but when Dion tried to assault him, he fought back before succumbing to the assault. Dion strangled Marquis.

Arrest
Dion, who was then on conditional release for raping a schoolteacher several years earlier, was arrested the day after his last murder. It was a description of Dion from another boy whom he had waylaid, but who had gotten away from him, that led to the police apprehending Dion. Once in prison, Dion held out for a month before he finally admitted to his crimes in detail to his interrogators. He then led investigators to the spot where he had buried the children's bodies.

Trial
Criminal lawyer Guy Bertrand defended Dion at his trial. Dion was, in the end, charged with only one murder, Pierre Marquis', due to a lack of evidence in the other cases. On 10 April 1964, Judge Gérard Lacroix sentenced him to be hanged. The death sentence was commuted to life imprisonment by then Governor General of Canada Georges Vanier after Bertrand's appeal to the Supreme Court of Canada in the matter had failed.

Death
On 17 November 1972, Dion was stabbed to death by a fellow inmate named Normand Champagne (also known as "Lawrence d'Arabie", or Lawrence of Arabia) who was later found not guilty of this crime by reason of insanity.

See also
List of serial killers by country

References

1920 births
1963 murders in Canada
1972 deaths
1972 murders in Canada
Canadian murder victims
Canadian murderers of children
Canadian rapists
Canadian serial killers
Canadian people convicted of murder
Canadian people who died in prison custody
Canadian prisoners sentenced to death
Deaths by stabbing in Canada
Incidents of violence against boys
Male serial killers
People convicted of murder by Canada
People murdered in Quebec
Prisoners sentenced to death by Canada
Prisoners who died in Canadian detention
Serial killers murdered in prison custody
Violence against men in North America